Dušan Ivković (born 24 November 1990) is a Serbian football striker.

References

External links
 
 Dušan Ivković Stats at utakmica.rs

1990 births
Living people
People from Inđija
Association football forwards
Serbian footballers
FK Inđija players
FK Javor Ivanjica players
FK Timok players
FK BSK Borča players
FK Kolubara players
Serbian SuperLiga players
Serbian expatriate footballers
Serbian expatriate sportspeople in Greece